Petar Šegedin may refer to:
Petar Šegedin (athlete) (1926–1994), Yugoslav middle and long distance runner
Petar Šegedin (writer) (1909–1998), Croatian writer